Stewart Ernest Cink (born May 21, 1973) is an American professional golfer who plays on the PGA Tour. He won the 2009 Open Championship, defeating Tom Watson in a four-hole aggregate playoff. He spent over 40 weeks in the top 10 of the Official World Golf Ranking from 2004 to 2009, reaching a career best ranking of 5th in 2008.

Early years and education
Cink was born in Huntsville, Alabama, and grew up in nearby Florence, where he attended Bradshaw High School. After completing high school in 1991, he graduated from Georgia Tech in Atlanta in 1995 with a degree in Management, where he played golf for the Yellow Jackets; he turned professional in 1995.

Professional career
After winning the Mexican Open and three events on the Nike Tour (now the Korn Ferry Tour) in 1996, Cink joined the PGA Tour in 1997 and won the Canon Greater Hartford Open in his rookie season. Cink performed consistently on the Tour over the next few years, picking up another win at the 2000 MCI Classic. Cink also contended in the 2001 U.S. Open, missing the playoff by a single stroke after making a bogey on the 72nd hole.  In 2004 Cink finished in fifth-place on the money list and had wins at the MCI Heritage and at the WGC-NEC Invitational, which is one of the World Golf Championships events.

On February 24, 2008, Cink was the runner-up in the WGC-Accenture Match Play Championship played in Marana, Arizona, falling 8 & 7 in the 36-hole final to top-ranked Tiger Woods. In June 2008, he reached his highest ever ranking, sixth, in the Official World Golf Rankings with his victory at the Travelers Championship in suburban Hartford.

On July 19, 2009, Cink won his first major title at the 138th Open Championship at Turnberry, Scotland, defeating 59-year-old, five-time champion Tom Watson by six strokes in a four-hole playoff. Cink had birdied the 72nd hole while Watson bogeyed, which forced the playoff.

On September 13, 2020, Cink won the Safeway Open for his first win since the 2009 Open Championship.

On April 18, 2021, Cink won the RBC Heritage for the third time. He became the fourth player to win twice in the same PGA Tour season after turning 47, the others being Sam Snead, Julius Boros and Kenny Perry (who did it two times). Cink broke the lowest 36-hole score and 54-hole score record for the tournament.

Personal life
Cink and his wife, Lisa, have two sons, Connor and Reagan. Cink is a Christian.

Professional wins (15)

PGA Tour wins (8)

PGA Tour playoff record (2–2)

European Tour wins (2)

European Tour playoff record (1–1)

Nike Tour wins (3)

Nike Tour playoff record (1–1)

Latin American wins (2)
1996 Mexican Open
1999 Mexican Open

Other wins (2)

Other playoff record (0–1)

Major championships

Wins (1)

1Defeated Watson in a four-hole aggregate playoff; Cink (4-3-4-3=14), Watson (5-3-7-5=20).

Results timeline
Results not in chronological order in 2020.

CUT = missed the half-way cut
"T" = tied
NT = No tournament due to COVID-19 pandemic

Summary

Most consecutive cuts made – 7 (1999 Masters – 2000 PGA)
Longest streak of top-10s – 1 (ten times)

Results in The Players Championship

CUT = missed the halfway cut
"T" indicates a tie for a place
C = Canceled after the first round due to the COVID-19 pandemic

World Golf Championships

Wins (1)

Results timeline
Results not in chronological order before 2015.

1Canceled due to 9/11
2Canceled due to COVID-19 pandemic

QF, R16, R32, R64 = Round in which player lost in match play
"T" = tied
NT = No Tournament
Note that the HSBC Champions did not become a WGC event until 2009.

U.S. national team appearances
Professional
Presidents Cup: 2000 (winners), 2005 (winners), 2007 (winners), 2009 (winners)
Ryder Cup: 2002, 2004, 2006, 2008 (winners), 2010
WGC-World Cup: 2005, 2006
Wendy's 3-Tour Challenge (representing PGA Tour): 2006 (winners), 2008, 2009

See also
1996 Nike Tour graduates

References

External links

American male golfers
Georgia Tech Yellow Jackets men's golfers
PGA Tour golfers
Ryder Cup competitors for the United States
Winners of men's major golf championships
Korn Ferry Tour graduates
Golfers from Alabama
Golfers from Georgia (U.S. state)
Sportspeople from Huntsville, Alabama
Sportspeople from Florence, Alabama
People from Duluth, Georgia
Sportspeople from the Atlanta metropolitan area
1973 births
Living people